Dahlan may refer to:

People
 Ahmad Dahlan (1868-1923), founder of Indonesian Muslim organisation Muhammadiyah
 Dahlan Iskan, Indonesian businessperson and Minister of State-owned Enterprises
 Mohammed Dahlan (born 1961), Palestinian political figure

Places
 Dahlan, Iran, a village in East Azerbaijan Province, Iran
 Dehlan, Himachal Pradesh, A village located in Himachal Pradesh, India